Selbusjø or Selbusjøen is the 17th largest lake in Norway. It is located in Trøndelag county, primarily in the municipality of Selbu, although the western end of it lies in the neighboring municipality of Trondheim. The  lake is the largest lake in the southern part of Trøndelag county. Selbusjø is part of the Nea-Nidelv watershed, with the Nea River flowing into it on the eastern end and the Nidelva River flowing out the western end. The villages of Selbustrand, Fossan, Tømra, Trøa, Innbygda, Mebonden, Vikvarvet, and Sjøbygda lie around the lake.

See also
List of lakes in Norway

References

	

Lakes of Trøndelag
Selbu
Klæbu